John Ridley (27 April 1952 – 3 May 2020) was an English footballer. A versatile player able to play as a defender or midfielder, he had a twelve-year professional career in the English Football League, playing for Port Vale and Chesterfield, as well as Leicester City. He also played for non-league Stafford Rangers and for American side Fort Lauderdale Strikers.

He was voted Port Vale F.C. Player of the Year in 1975–76, won the Anglo-Scottish Cup with Chesterfield in 1981, and helped Port Vale to win promotion out of the Fourth Division in 1982–83. Qualifying as a teacher before he began his football career, once he retired he returned to the education profession.

Career

Port Vale
As a young man, Ridley played for Sheffield University and other English Universities, as he earned his degree and qualified as a teacher. This achieved, he then signed professional forms with Port Vale in July 1973, having previously been at the club on youth terms. He came through to the professional ranks at the same time as David Harris, who would also become a key player for the "Valiants". Ridley played ten Third Division games in 1973–74. He scored his first goal in senior football in a 3–1 win over Charlton Athletic on 27 April 1974.

He established himself in the first-team as a midfielder under manager Roy Sproson by March 1975, and played nineteen games of the 1974–75 campaign. He was an ever-present for the 1975–76 season, playing 52 games and finding the net against Rotherham United. His performances earned him the Player of the Year award at the end of the season. He played a further 45 games in 1976–77, scoring once against Swindon Town. He formed a solid centre-back partnership with David Harris and was linked with a transfer away from the club but suffered a loss of form and an injury at a crucial time.

Ridley played 47 games of the 1977–78 season, and found the net in a 5–2 demolition of non-league Arnold in the FA Cup First Round. However Vale suffered relegation into the Fourth Division at the end of the season under Bobby Smith. In May 1978 he was loaned to American side Fort Lauderdale Strikers, who were competing in the now defunct North American Soccer League. Strikers finished third in their four team East Division, though he returned early in August after suffering from illness. Strikers went on to reach the Conference finals, losing a penalty shoot-out to the Tampa Bay Rowdies. He played 22 games in the United States, scoring one goal and claiming one assist.

Leicester City
He played seven games for Vale at the start of the 1978–79, before he was sold to Leicester City for a then club-record £55,000 fee in October 1978. The "Foxes" were then a Second Division side, and avoided relegation by three points in 1978–79. A Frank McLintock signing, when Jock Wallace took over as manager Ridley's days at Filbert Street were numbered. He played 24 league games as a defensive midfielder for Leicester, before he was sold on to Chesterfield for a £35,000 fee in August 1979.

Chesterfield
He was used in defence at Chesterfield, and formed an impressive centre-back partnership with Bill Green. Chesterfield missed out on promotion from the Third Division in 1979–80 after finishing one point behind Sheffield Wednesday. The "Spireites" went close again 1980–81, finishing three points behind promotion winners Barnsley and Charlton Athletic. They also won the last ever instalment of the Anglo-Scottish Cup following a 2–1 win over Notts County. Chesterfield then posted a disappointing eleventh-place finish in 1981–82, and Ridley returned to Port Vale in July 1982, amid a financial crisis at Chesterfield. He joined the Vale on a non-contract basis so as to continue his day job as a teacher.

Return to Port Vale
Ridley switched between defence and midfield as he played 44 games in 1982–83, as Vale won promotion out of the Fourth Division in third place under the management of John McGrath. He also found the net in games at Mansfield Town, Hereford United, and Hartlepool United. However Vale failed to retain their third tier status in 1983–84; Ridley scored against Newport County and Southend United as he made 35 appearances. He played in a centre-back partnership with Phil Sproson, taking the place of Sproson's partner from Ridley's first spell – Graham Hawkins, who was now retired. He played 51 games under John Rudge in the 1984–85 campaign. At the end of the season he joined Stafford Rangers in a player-coach capacity for a fee that was settled at £700 following a tribunal. Rangers were promoted to the Alliance Premier League for the 1985–86 season.

Style of play
The Chesterfield F.C. website described Ridley as "a powerful, dominating type, [who] nevertheless had a calming influence and elegant touch to his play." He was described by Jeff Kent as "tall and elegant".

Later life
After finishing his playing career, Ridley went on to coach at Stafford Rangers, Matlock Town and Newcastle Town. He carried on playing amateur football long after leaving Port Vale and won the Sentinel Sunday Cup at age 48. He also went on to teach maths at various schools, spending many years at James Brindley High School in Chell.

Career statistics
Source:

Honours
Individual
Port Vale F.C. Player of the Year: 1976

Chesterfield
Anglo-Scottish Cup: 1981

Port Vale
Football League Fourth Division third-place promotion: 1982–83

References

Sportspeople from Consett
Footballers from County Durham
Association football defenders
Association football midfielders
English footballers
Alumni of the University of Sheffield
Port Vale F.C. players
English expatriate footballers
Expatriate soccer players in the United States
English expatriate sportspeople in the United States
Fort Lauderdale Strikers (1977–1983) players
Leicester City F.C. players
Chesterfield F.C. players
Stafford Rangers F.C. players
English Football League players
North American Soccer League (1968–1984) players
National League (English football) players
Association football coaches
Schoolteachers from County Durham
Mathematics educators
1952 births
2020 deaths